Philippe Eullaffroy (born January 9, 1964) is a French football manager and former footballer who played as a forward. He is currently the performance manager for Quebec Soccer.

Playing career 
Eullaffroy played professional football with Troyes AC from 1982–1991. He was selected to the team of the century by the fans and set a record after scoring the fastest goal in club history.

Managerial career

College level 
Eullaffroy began his managerial career in his native France with the Stade de Reims and Troyes AC youth academies. In 2005, he moved abroad to Canada where he began to manage the McGill Redmen, where he coached the team for three years. During his tenure with McGill, he was named the Coach of the Year for all three seasons.

Canadian Soccer League 
In 2009, he was appointed head coach for Trois-Rivières Attak in the Canadian Soccer League. In his first season with the Attak, he led the club to their second National Division title. In the postseason the club reached the CSL Championship finals match where the Attak won in penalties against International Division champions the Serbian White Eagles. For his achievements with the Attak in his debut season he was awarded the CSL Coach of the Year award. The following year Trois-Rivières ceased operations due to the ended cooperation as the farm team for the Montreal Impact, in which the ownership waived their players rights and opened their territory for the benefit of the Montreal Impact Academy. 

On March 23, 2010 Eullaffroy was appointed the head coach for the Montreal Impact Academy. He managed to lead Montreal to the CSL Championship final in the 2012 season but was defeated by First Division champions Toronto Croatia.

Montreal Impact 
In 2013, he served as the Montreal Impact assistant coach under head coach Marco Schällibaum in the Major League Soccer. In 2014, he was named the academy director for the Montreal Impact academy. On November 17, 2014, Eullaffroy was hired as the head coach for the expansion franchise FC Montreal which began play in 2015 in the USL Pro. 

On July 3, 2020, Montreal dismissed him from his post as the academy's director.

Quebec soccer 
In 2022, he ventured into the administrative side of soccer as the performance manager for the Quebec Soccer Federation.

Managerial stats

Honors

Managerial 
Trois-Rivières Attak
 CSL Championship: 2009
 National Division Champions: 2009

References

1964 births
Living people
Soccer people from Quebec
Association football forwards
ES Troyes AC players
French footballers
French football managers
Trois-Rivières Attak coaches
CF Montréal non-playing staff
Canadian Soccer League (1998–present) managers
Sportspeople from Troyes
Footballers from Grand Est
French expatriate football managers
French expatriate sportspeople in Canada
Expatriate soccer managers in Canada